Fernando Giner Gil (born 31 December 1964 in Alboraya, Valencian Community) is a Spanish former footballer who played as a central defender.

Honours
Valencia
Segunda División: 1986–87

Levante
Segunda División B: 1998–99

Spain U21
UEFA European Under-21 Championship: 1986

External links

CiberChe biography and stats 

1964 births
Living people
People from Horta Nord
Sportspeople from the Province of Valencia
Spanish footballers
Footballers from the Valencian Community
Association football defenders
La Liga players
Segunda División players
Segunda División B players
Tercera División players
Valencia CF Mestalla footballers
Valencia CF players
Sporting de Gijón players
Hércules CF players
Levante UD footballers
Spain youth international footballers
Spain under-21 international footballers
Spain international footballers
Spanish football managers
Tercera División managers